Trouble in Paradise is the seventh album by American composer Randy Newman. It spawned local anthem "I Love L.A.", and minor hit, "The Blues," a duet with Paul Simon.

It placed 13th in the 1983 Pazz & Jop Critics Poll, and it was ranked as number 67 on Rolling Stone'''s 100 Greatest Albums of the 80s list.

A cover version of "Real Emotional Girl" by the Canadian singer Patricia O'Callaghan appears on her 2001 album Real Emotional Girl''.

Track listing
All songs written by Randy Newman.

 "I Love L.A." – 3:29
 "Christmas in Capetown" – 4:21
 "The Blues" – 3:01
 "Same Girl" – 2:53
 "Mikey's" – 2:10
 "My Life Is Good" – 4:38
 "Miami" – 4:04
 "Real Emotional Girl" – 2:28
 "Take Me Back" – 4:09
 "There's a Party at My House" – 2:50
 "I'm Different" – 2:33
 "Song for the Dead" – 3:00

Personnel
 Randy Newman – vocals, piano, synthesizers, arranger, conductor
 Steve Lukather – guitar
 David Paich – farfisa organ, Fender Rhodes
 Michael Boddicker – synthesizers, piano on "Mikey's", hammond organ on "Miami"
 Nathan East – bass guitar
 Jeff Porcaro – drums
 Lenny Castro – percussion
 Paulinho Da Costa – percussion on "Take Me Back", "Christmas in Capetown" and "The Blues"
 Ralph Grierson – piano on "Same Girl" and "Real Emotional Girl"
 Neil Larsen – piano solo on "The Blues"
 Dean Parks – guitar on "I'm Different", guitar solo on "The Blues", mandolin on "Miami"
 Waddy Wachtel – rhythm guitar on "I Love L.A"
 Paul Simon – vocals on "The Blues"
 Larry Williams – horns on "Take Me Back" and "I Love L.A"
Steve Madaio – horns on "Take Me Back"
Ernie Watts – horns on "Take Me Back", sax solo on "My Life Is Good"
 Jerry Hey – horns on "There's A Party at My House"
 Jim Horn, Jon Smith – horns on "There's A Party at My House" and "Mickey's"
Jennifer Warnes, Wendy Waldman, Linda Ronstadt – backing vocals on "I'm Different" and "Christmas in Capetown"
 Don Henley, Bob Seger – backing vocals on "Take Me Back" and "Christmas in Capetown"
 Rickie Lee Jones, Arno Lucas, Leslie Smith – backing vocals on "Miami"
Christine McVie, Lindsey Buckingham – backing vocals on "I Love L.A"
Technical
Mark Linett – engineer, mixing
Tim Newman – cover photography

References

1983 albums
Randy Newman albums
Albums produced by Russ Titelman
Albums produced by Lenny Waronker
Reprise Records albums
Albums arranged by Randy Newman
Albums conducted by Randy Newman